The fifteenth season of Let's Dance started on February 18, 2022, with the launch show on RTL, with the first regular show starting on February 25, 2022. Daniel Hartwich and Victoria Swarovski returned as hosts. Joachim Llambi, Motsi Mabuse and Jorge Gonzalez returned as judges.

Like in the previous seasons during the launch show the 14 celebrities found out which professional dancer they will dance with for the next few weeks.

Dancing Stars 2022 were René Casselly & Kathrin Menzinger.

Couples
In January 2022, RTL announced the 14 celebrities which will participate this season. On February 4, 2022, the professional dancers of the season were announced.

Scoring chart

Red numbers indicates the lowest score for each week.
Green numbers indicates the highest score for each week.
 indicates the couple eliminated that week.
 indicates the returning couple that finished in the bottom two or three.
 indicates the couple which was immune from elimination.
 indicates the couple that didn't perform due to personal reasons.
 indicates the couple that withdrew from the competition.
 indicates the couple was eliminated but later returned to the competition.
 indicates the winning couple.
 indicates the runner-up couple.
 indicates the third-place couple.

Averages 
This table only counts for dances scored on a traditional 30-points scale.

Highest and lowest scoring performances 
The best and worst performances in each dance according to the judges' marks are as follows:

Couples' highest and lowest scoring dances
According to the traditional 30-point scale.

Weekly scores and songs

Launch show
For the sixth time, there was a launch show in which each celebrity met their partner for the first time. This show aired on 18 February 2022. In this first live show the celebrities and the professional partners danced in groups and each celebrity was awarded points by the judges and the viewers. At the end of the show the couple with the highest combined points was granted immunity from the first elimination in the following week.

After Renata and Valentin Lusin won the Profi Challenge together the year before, Renata Lusin was allowed to choose a celebrity partner. Afterwards Lusin chose Mathias Mester as her celebrity partner.

Due to a COVID-19 infection, Joachim Llambi was replaced by last year's winner Rúrik Gíslason.

Key
 Celebrity won immunity from the first elimination

The Team dances

Week 1

Due to a COVID-19 infection, Hardy & Patricija were unable to perform. Under the rules of the show, they were given a bye to the following week.

Week 2: "Born in ..." 

The couples danced one unlearned dance to a song that came out the year the celebrities were born.

Due to his ongoing COVID-19 infection, Hardy Krüger jr. had to leave the show. Lilly zu Sayn-Wittgenstein-Berleburg, who was eliminated in the last show, returned to the competition.

Andrzej Cibis and Malika Dzumaev also tested positive for COVID-19 and where replaced by Jimmie Surles and Patricija Ionel.

Due to a cold, Bastian & Ekaterina were unable to perform. They were given a bye to the following week.

Week 3 

Due to a COVID-19 infection, Caroline & Valentin and Timur & Malika were unable to perform. They were given a bye to the following week.

Due to his ongoing COVID-19 infection, Andrzej Cibis could not return as dance partner for Lilly zu Sayn-Wittgenstein-Berleburg. She was supposed to continue the show with Robert Beitsch. Since she was also tested positive, she was unable to perform and was given a bye to the following week as well.

No elimination took place. As the winners of the evening, René & Kathrin received a bonus ranking point for the following show.

Week 4 

Due to a COVID-19 infection Kathrin Menzinger was replaced by Regina Luca. A double elimination took place.

Week 5: "Made in Germany" 

The couples danced one unlearned dance to German music.

Due to COVID-19 infections, René & Kathrin were unable to perform and Renata Lusin was replaced by Patricija Ionel. René & Kathrin were given a bye to the following week. Host Daniel Hartwich also tested positive and was replaced by Jan Köppen.

Week 6 

Due to back problems, Michelle had to withdraw from the show. Caroline Bosbach, who was eliminated in the last show, returned to the competition.

Week 7: "Love Week" 

The couples performed one unlearned dance to love songs and a team dance coached by one of the three judges. To avoid favoritism, the judges did not score the couples they coached, so the team dances received a total score out of 20 instead of the usual 30 points.

Week 8 

The couples performed one unlearned dance and competed in the discofox marathon. Viewers were able to vote for the songs online.

Week 9: "Magic Moments" 

The couples performed a freestyle to celebrate their magic moment in life and competeted in a dance duel.

{| class="wikitable center sortable" style="text-align:center; font-size:100%; line-height:20px;"
! rowspan="2" style="width: 4em"| Order
! rowspan="2" style="width: 17em"| Couple
! rowspan="2" style="width: 20em"| Dance
! rowspan="2" style="width: 40em"| Music
! colspan="3"| Judge's Scores 
! rowspan="2" style="width: 6em"|Total
! rowspan="2" style="width: 7em"| Result
|-
! style="width: 6em"|González
! style="width: 6em"|Mabuse
! style="width: 6em"|Llambi
|-
| 1
| Bastian & Ekaterina
| rowspan="6"|Freestyle
| "We Will Rock You" - Queen/ "Experience" - Ludovico Einaudi
| 5
| 5
| 3
| 13
| Eliminated
|-
| 2
| Mathias & Renata
| "River Flows In You" - Yiruma/ "Mach dich groß" - Seelemann
| 8
| 8
| 6
| 22
| Bottom three
|-
| 3
| Sarah & Vadim
| "Neuanfang" - Clueso/ "Midnight City" - M83/ "Roar" - Katy Perry
| 8
| 8
| 6
| 22
| Bottom two
|-
| 4
| Amira & Massimo
| "Papaoutai" - Stromae
| 10
| 10
| 10
| 30
| Safe
|-
| 5
| René & Kathrin
| "Human" - Rag'n'Bone Man
| 10
| 10
| 10
| 30
| Safe
|-
| 6
| Janin & Zsolt
| "You've Got the Love" - Florence and the Machine
| 10
| 10
| 10
| 30
| Safe
|-
| colspan="9" | Dance Duels
|-
| rowspan="2" | 1
| Sarah & Vadim
| rowspan="2" | Bachata
| rowspan="2" | "Obsesión" - Aventura
| 9
| 9
| 8
| 26
| rowspan="2" | Sarah & Vadim won the Dance Duel
|-
| Amira & Massimo
| 9
| 9
| 7
| 25
|-
| rowspan="2" | 2
| Bastian & Ekaterina
| rowspan="2" | Street dance
| rowspan="2" | "Shape of You" - Major Lazer feat. Nyla & Kranium
| 5
| 5
| 3
| 13
| rowspan="2" | Mathias & Renata won the Dance Duel|-
| Mathias & Renata
| 7
| 7
| 6
| 20
|-
| rowspan="2" | 3
| René & Kathrin 
| rowspan="2" | Lindy Hop
| rowspan="2" | "I Need You" - Jon Batiste
| 10
| 10
| 10
| 30
| rowspan="2" | The couples tied in the Dance Duel|-
| Janin & Zsolt
| 10
| 10
| 10
| 30
|}
 Week 10: Quarter-final 

The couples performed one unlearned dance in round one and a trio dance with another professional partner in round two.

 Week 11: Semi-final 

The couples will perform two unlearned dances and an Impro dance ("Impro Dance Even NOCH More Extreme"''). The specific dance style, music and costumes for the Impro dance will be given to the couples only three minutes before their performance.

Week 12: Final

Dance chart
 Highest scoring dance
 Lowest scoring dance
 Not performed due to illness or injury
 Couple withdrew that week

Launch show: Cha-cha-cha, Quickstep, Salsa, Tango or Viennese waltz 
Week 1: Cha-cha-cha, Quickstep, Salsa, Tango, Viennese waltz or Waltz  (introducing Waltz)
Week 2: One unlearned dance (introducing Jive, Rumba, Foxtrot and Paso doble)
Week 3: One unlearned dance (introducing Charleston and Contemporary)
Week 4: One unlearned dance (introducing Samba) and Freestyle (Boys vs Girls Battle)
Week 5: One unlearned dance
Week 6: One unlearned dance
Week 7: One unlearned dance and Freestyle (Team Battle)
Week 8: One unlearned dance and Discofox (Discofox Marathon)
Week 9: Freestyle and Dance Duel (introducing Lindy Hop, Street dance and Bachata)
Week 10: One unlearned dance and Trio Dance
Week 11: Two unlearned dances and Impro Dance Even NOCH More Extreme (Semi-Finals)
Week 12: Dance chosen by the judges, favourite dance and Freestyle (Finals)

References

External links
Official website

Let's Dance (German TV series)
2022 German television seasons